Choneziphius is an extinct genus of ziphiidae cetaceans, with two species known from the Miocene: C. planirostris and C. leidyi. Known from the shore of Belgium, Portugal and Spain.

References

Prehistoric toothed whales
Ziphiids
Prehistoric cetacean genera
Fossil taxa described in 1851
Extinct mammals of North America
Extinct mammals of Europe
Miocene cetaceans